Mort Sourcebook is a 1995 role-playing game supplement for SLA Industries published by Wizards of the Coast.

Contents
Mort Sourcebook offers a guide both to the city of Mort, the site of SLA Industries' HQ, and to many of its most important features, as well as a selection of contracts (BPNs) set within the city boundaries and suitable for almost any squad of Operatives.

Reception
Andy Butcher reviewed Mort Sourcebook for Arcane magazine, rating it a 6 out of 10 overall. Butcher comments that "As a guide to Mort itself [...] the Mort Sourcebook is somewhat less than impressive. It will, however, prove very useful to almost any SLA referee, both in terms of inspiration and actual usable information. You just can't help thinking that much of this should have been in the basic rules, leaving more space here for the city..."

The Mort Sourcebook was banned at Gen Con under TSR due to a
purported picture of genitalia on the back cover.

References

Role-playing game supplements introduced in 1995
Science fiction role-playing game supplements